Thomas LeRoy Collins Jr. (1934–2010) was a United States Navy officer, businessman, and political figure.

Collins was the son of former Florida Governor LeRoy Collins and a fifth-generation Floridian. He graduated from the United States Naval Academy in 1956 and served in the United States Navy and United States Navy Reserve (submarines) for 34 years, retiring as a rear admiral. His civilian career was in the high-tech financial services and real estate industries and spanned 36 years.

Collins ran in the U.S. Senate Republican primary for Florida in 2006, but lost to U.S. Representative Katherine Harris. He came in third place, gaining 15.3 percent of the vote. Newly elected Governor Charlie Crist appointed Collins as Executive Director of the Florida Department of Veterans Affairs.

Collins died on July 29, 2010 in Tampa, Florida, after an SUV collided with him while he was riding his bicycle.

References

External links
Official website
Bio as Director of Veterans Affairs

Florida Republicans
2010 deaths
1934 births
State cabinet secretaries of Florida
United States Naval Academy alumni
Road incident deaths in Florida
United States Navy rear admirals